To the Core is the seventh studio album by guitarist Vinnie Moore, released on May 26, 2009 through Mascot Records.

Track listing

Personnel
Vinnie Moore – guitar, production
Tim Lehner – keyboard
Van Romaine – drums
John DeServio – bass
Tim Conklin – engineering
Paul Northfield – mixing
Ryan J-W Smith – mastering

References

External links
Vinnie Moore: Moore to Love at Guitar World

Vinnie Moore albums
2009 albums